Reversal of Man was a hardcore punk band from Tampa, Florida that formed in 1995. The band is associated with the late 1990s screamo movement and noted for bordering on powerviolence and grindcore. The group's lyrical content was often political, and the group initially formed as a reaction to the then-growing underground nazi punk scene in Florida.

During their existence, the band toured frequently across the United States as well as parts of Europe. Vocalist Matt Coplon was known for taping his microphone to his hand in order to not lose it during spastic performances. The band were signed onto Ebullition Records for the release of their sole full-length This Is Medicine in 1999 after label operator Kent McClard found out about them through their split 12-inch with Holocron. Jeremy Bolm of Touché Amoré has described This Is Medicine as one of his favorite albums.

The group would eventually break up in 2000, with members going on to play in bands such as CombatWoundedVeteran, Fathers, Horsewhip, Guiltmaker and Light Yourself on Fire.

Members
Final line-up
Matt Coplon – vocals (1995–2000)
Chris Norris – guitar (1999–2000)
Jeff Howe – bass, vocals (1996–2000)
Dan Radde – guitar, vocals (1998–2000)
John Willey – drums (1995–2000)

Past members
Jason Crittenden – guitar (1997–1999)
Jasen Weitekamp – guitar (1996–1998)
Joe Camacho – guitar (1995–1996)
Jason Rubacky – bass (1995–1996)
Chris Hitchcock – guitar (1995–1996)

Touring musicians
Jeremy Gewertz – drums 

Timeline

Discography

Studio albums
This Is Medicine (1999, Ebullition)

EPs
Reversal of Man demo tape (1995, Self-released)
Reversal of Man 7-inch (1996, Valrico)
Revolution Summer 10-inch/CD (1998, Independence Day)

Splits
Reversal of Man/Cease split 7-inch (1995, Blacksmith/Plead)
Puritan/Reversal of Man split LP (1995, King Of The Monsters)
Holocron/Reversal of Man split LP (1996, Intention)
Enemy Soil/Reversal of Man split 7-inch (1998, Fist Held High)
Los Crudos/Reversal of Man split LP (2001, Ebullition)
Electric Youth Crew split 12-inch/CD with CombatWoundedVeteran (2002, Schematics)

Compilation albums
Discography (2001, Schematics)

Compilation appearances
Placebo (1995, Concurrent) - "Assembly"
Follow N' Believe: A Food Not Bombs Benefit Compilation (1996, Element) - "A Child's Dream"
Israfel (1997, Ape) - "Untitled"
The Caligula Effect (1997, Catechism) - "Silver Pieces Of Eight"
Between A Rock And A Hard Place (1998, Witching Hour) - "I'm A New York City Detective That Strays From Cheap Suits And Short Sleeve Shirts And TiesThe Great Enlightenment? (1998, A-Team/Hit The Ground Running) - "Theory Of La Masastra"403 Comp (Florida Fucking Hardcore) (1998, Schematics) - "These Hills Have Eyes"The Brave Do Not Fear The Grave (1999, Alveran/Grave Romance) - "Mercy"Back To Donut! (1999, No Idea) - "The Set Up"Che Fest 1999 (1999, Slowdance) - "Quantis"Can't Stop This Train'' (1999, Join The Team Player) - "These Hills Have Eyes"

References

External links
Reversal Of Man on Bandcamp
Reversal Of Man Webpage (Archived)

Hardcore punk groups from Florida
Punk rock groups from Florida
American screamo musical groups
Powerviolence groups
American grindcore musical groups
Musical groups from Tampa, Florida
1995 establishments in Florida
2000 disestablishments in Florida
Musical groups established in 1995
Musical groups disestablished in 2000
Musical quintets